James Wilson (circa 1866 – 1900) was a Scottish footballer, who played for Vale of Leven and Scotland.

References

Sources

External links

London Hearts profile

1860s births
Year of birth uncertain
Date of birth missing
1900 deaths
Scottish footballers
Scotland international footballers
Vale of Leven F.C. players
Association football goalkeepers
Scottish football referees